Chadwell Heath is an area in east London, England.

The name was first used in the 17th century for a settlement in the parish of Dagenham in Essex, which later absorbed the neighbouring hamlet of Chadwell Street in the parish of Barking (later Ilford). Chadwell Heath railway station, on the Great Eastern Main Line, opened in 1864, connecting the area to Central London. After the First World War, the area developed as a residential suburb and formed the northern limit of the Becontree estate, causing an increase in population density. The area became part of Greater London in 1965.

The area is home to the Chadwell Heath Academy.

History

Toponymy
The name 'Chadwell' is first recorded in 1254 as Chaudewell and means 'the cold spring'. The name was first applied to a settlement on the Barking (later Ilford) side of the ancient boundary between Dagenham and Barking and it was also known as Chadwell Street; 'Street' having the older meaning of a hamlet. In the 17th century the Blackheath Common in Dagenham parish was renamed Chadwell Heath. As the settlements merged the Chadwell Street name was lost in favour of Chadwell Heath.

Economic development
The railway was constructed through the area from Romford and Ilford and in 1864 Chadwell Heath railway station was opened. It was the 'end of the line' for both the London tram system and later the electric trolley bus service from Aldgate. The trolley buses turned around at Station Road and Wangey Road.

Local government

Chadwell Heath formed a hamlet in the ancient parish of Dagenham, Essex. As Chadwell Heath grew it absorbed the neighbouring hamlet of Chadwell Street in the Chadwell ward of the parish of Barking. The Barking section of Chadwell Heath became part of the new parish of Ilford in 1888. This became Ilford Urban District in 1894. The Dagenham section became part of Romford Rural District in 1894. The parish was removed from the rural district and became Dagenham Urban District in 1926. During the 1920s and 1930s the local government arrangements of the area came under review and various proposals would have merged the two sections of Chadwell Heath into a single district, however this was not acted upon.

Ilford was incorporated as a municipal borough in 1926 and Dagenham was incorporated in 1938. The arrangements of the area were reviewed again in the 1950s and 1960s. The whole area was considered to form part of the Greater London conurbation and in 1957 formed part of the review area of the Royal Commission on Local Government in Greater London. Following the review, in 1965 the London Government Act 1963 abolished the municipal boroughs of Dagenham and Ilford, and transferred their former area from Essex to Greater London, to form part of the new London Borough of Barking and the London Borough of Redbridge.

Urban development
The London to Colchester Roman Road caused some early 'ribbon' development while much of the rest of the area remained rural. Suburban growth commenced in 1900 and proceeded rapidly until World War I; increasing after the war.

The area suffered several bomb hits during World War Two. A large parachute mine also exploded causing extensive residential damage in Bennett Road, destroying the school, while a second failed to explode and its parachute became entangled in horse-chestnut trees near Chadwell Heath station. It did not explode because it was cradled in very soft soil as the result of digging near Hemmings Bakery. It was found by Walter Wiffen, a train guard from Cedar Park Gardens on his way to work at the station early the next morning. He reported it at the police station, which is now the Eva Hart pub, and oversaw the evacuation of Cedar Park Gardens to the bomb shelter at the corner of Wangey Road and the High Road. A V2 rocket landed on Blackbush Avenue killing several people and blowing out windows for half a mile around. Later, the local council replaced the windows with much more modern frames, and the results provided an incongruous look to the older house designs. A heavy anti-aircraft battery was located east of Whalebone Lane North and traces of the concrete emplacements remain today. A V2 Rocket destroyed two houses in Woodlands Avenue and damaged the houses that had been repaired after the landmine that had destroyed the Whalebone Junior school in Bennett Road.

Governance
Chadwell Heath is split between the Chadwell ward in the London Borough of Redbridge and the Chadwell Heath and Whalebone wards in the London Borough of Barking and Dagenham, electing councillors to Barking and Dagenham London Borough Council and Redbridge London Borough Council.

Demography
In the 2011 census, the combined wards of Chadwell in Redbridge and Chadwell Heath in Barking and Dagenham had a total population of 24,278 people. The two combined wards had no single ethnic majority, with the largest group being White British people comprising 44.3% of the population. The next largest groups were Indians (9.5%), Black Africans (9.3%), Black Caribbeans (5.7%), Bangladeshis (5.6%), Pakistanis (5.5%) and Other Whites (5.2%).

Geography
The London Borough of Havering is to the east. Many major buildings, such as the local school and former police station (now the popular pub, the Eva Hart) actually lie in the London Borough of Redbridge. Royal Mail includes Chadwell Heath as part of a postcode district (RM6) of the Romford post town, however the town of Romford is in Havering.

The area has three allotments.  One adjacent to St Chad's Park on Alexandra Road, another on Chadwell Heath Lane and a plot in Little Heath next to the Eastern Avenue / A12 (next to the Hargreaves Scout centre).

Transport
Chadwell Heath is served by London Buses services and TfL Rail at Chadwell Heath railway station which is currently being upgraded as part of the Crossrail Project. It has easy rail access to Liverpool Street Station in the City of London. London Buses routes that serve Chadwell Heath are the 62 from Marks Gate 'Billet Road' to Barking 'Gascoigne Estate'; 86 from Romford Station to Stratford Station; 173 from King George Hospital 'Goodmayes' to Beckton Station; 362 from King George Hospital 'Goodmayes' to Grange Hill Station; 368 from Chadwell Heath 'Police Station' to Barking 'Harts Lane' and night bus N86 from Stratford Station to Harold Hill 'Dagnam Park Square'.

Embassy Cinema

There is a former art deco cinema on Chadwell Heath High Road, built in May 1934, and was originally called the Embassy Cinema; later it became part of the Gaumont British Circuit. During the late 1960s, it was converted into a Bingo Hall - known to many locals as the Mecca Bingo Hall Mecca Bingo. Recently,  the building was listed as an Asset of Community Value by the 'Chadwell Heath South Residents' Association' in August 2017.  The premises presently houses Mayfair Venue, an events centre.

Religion
The Roman Catholic Church, St Bede's, is on Bishops Avenue. St Chad's Church (Church of England) stands on St Chad's Road. Chadwell Heath has two baptist churches. Other churches include the United Reformed Church (URC), and the Brethren Assembly in Wangey Road.

Sport
West Ham United's training ground was located in the area until late 2015. On 10 December 2015, Slaven Bilic, then West Ham manager, announced that from 14 December the club would be moving from the old training ground (at Saville Road) to the new training ground at nearby Rush Green, London.

Notable current or former locals/residents
Mary Wollstonecraft
Henry Gillard Glindoni
Eva Hart
Millicent Martin
Michelle Dockery
Mark Summers
Rhian Brewster
Jackie Oliver
Mark Lazarus
Jim Peters (athlete)
Nicky Shorey

References

 
Areas of London
Districts of the London Borough of Redbridge
Districts of the London Borough of Barking and Dagenham
District centres of London
Ilford
Dagenham